Polyaulacus is a genus of beetles in the family Carabidae, containing the following species:

 Polyaulacus brunneus Chaudoir, 1878
 Polyaulacus kilmanus Alluaud, 1917
 Polyaulacus nigrostriatus Basilewsky, 1947
 Polyaulacus pallidus Peringuey, 1908

References

Lebiinae